Ficus nota is a species of flowering plant in the family Moraceae. It is commonly known as tibig or sacking tree, is a species of fig tree found near water in low altitudes. Tibig is native to the Philippines. They are also found in parts of northern Borneo in Malaysia.The tree can grow up to 9 meters high. It is primarily dispersed by birds which eat the fruits and excrete the seeds. The fruits are also edible to humans, although they are rather bland. They are usually eaten with sugar and cream in the Philippines. The young leaves are also eaten as a vegetable.

References

nota
Taxa named by Francisco Manuel Blanco